MC21-A (bromophene) is an bactericidal antibiotic isolated from the O-BC30 strain of a new marine bacterium, Pseudoalteromonas phenolica.

References 

Antibiotics
Bromoarenes
Phenols
Biphenyls
Halogen-containing natural products